Dianna Dilworth (born 1978 in San Diego, California) is a filmmaker and journalist. She attended San Francisco State University and the European Graduate School.

She is the director of We Are the Children, a documentary about Michael Jackson's fans during his 2004-2005 trial, which is distributed by independent film distribution company Indiepix. She is also the director of a feature-length documentary on the Mellotron called Mellodrama.

She also directed "The Gallery Is a Guillotine", a music video for the Most Holy Trinity on Brown Bottle Records; "Lonely Wine", a music video for artist TK Webb and label The Social Registry; and "What You Wish For", a music video for Telescope Music.

She directs documentaries about culture in New York City for Current TV.

As a freelance magazine writer, her articles have appeared in The Believer, Dwell, Russian Esquire, Architectural Record, and Plenty.

References

External links
 Dianna Dilworth personal website
 Dianna Dilworth in Rhizome
 Mellodrama
 Dianna Dilworth interview at Indiepix
 

American documentary filmmakers
1978 births
Living people